The Santa language, also known as Dongxiang, is a Mongolic language spoken by the Dongxiang people in Northwest China.

Dialects
There are no dialects in strict sense, but three local varieties (tuyu) can be found: Suonanba (ca. 50% of all Dongxiang speakers), Wangjiaji (ca. 30% of all Dongxiang speakers) and Sijiaji (ca. 20% of all Dongxiang speakers).

Phonology 
Except for a limited number of cases there is no vowel harmony and the harmonic rules governing the suffix pronunciation are by far not as strict as those of Mongolian.

Consonants
Dongxiang has 29 consonants:

Vowels
Dongxiang has 7 vowels. Unlike other neighboring Mongolic languages, it has neither vowel harmony nor distinctions of vowel length.

Grammar

Morphology

Plural marking
 -la (remaining of nouns)

 -sla/-sila (certain nouns and pronouns)

 -pi (relatives)

Cases 
Santa/Dongxiang has 6 cases.

Syntax
In common with other Mongolic languages, Dongxiang is spoken as an SOV language. In Linxia, however, under the influence of the Mandarin Chinese dialects spoken by the neighbouring Hui people, sentences of the SVO type have also been observed.

Writing system
Knowledge of Arabic is widespread among the Sarta and as a result, they often use the Arabic script to write down their language informally (cf. the Xiao'erjing system that was used by Hui people); however, this has been little investigated by scholars. , the official Latin alphabet for Dongxiang, developed on the basis of the Monguor alphabet, remained in the experimental stage.

Numerals

The Tangwang language

There are about 20,000 people in the north-eastern part Dongxiang County, who self-identify as Dongxiang or Hui people who do not speak Dongxiang, but natively speak a Dongxiang-influenced form of Mandarin Chinese. The linguist Mei W. Lee-Smith calls this the "Tangwang language", based on the names of the two largest villages (Tangjia and Wangjia, parts of Tangwang Town) where it is spoken and argues it is a creolized language.
According to Lee-Smith, the Tangwang language uses mostly Mandarin words and morphemes with Dongxiang grammar. Besides Dongxiang loanwords, Tangwang also has a substantial number of Arabic and Persian loanwords.

Like Standard Mandarin, Tangwang is a tonal language, but grammatical particles, which are typically borrowed from Mandarin, but are used in the way Dongxiang morphemes would be used in Dongxiang, don't carry tones.

For example, while the Mandarin plural suffix -men (们) has only very restricted usage (it can be used with personal pronouns and some nouns related to people),  Tangwang uses it, in the form -m, universally, the way Dongxiang would use its plural suffix -la. Mandarin pronoun ni (你) can be used in Tangwang as a possessive suffix (meaning "your").
Unlike Mandarin, but like Dongxiang, Tangwang has grammatical cases as well (however only four of them, unlike eight in Dongxiang).

References

Bibliography

Further reading

External links
 The Dongxiang Mongols and Their Language
 An example of the Dongxiang language being spoken

Agglutinative languages
Languages of China
Southern Mongolic languages
Dongxiang people
Subject–object–verb languages
Mongolic languages